The Breviary Hymns of the Rosary were the four hymns that were sung during the Liturgy of the Hours for the Feast of the Rosary. Each hymn celebrates a category of mysteries of the rosary.

See also
Book of hours

References

Liturgy of the Hours
Rosary